Skælskør Parish is a parish in the Diocese of Roskilde in Slagelse Municipality, Denmark. The parish contains the town of Skælskør.

References 

Slagelse Municipality
Parishes of Denmark